Hungarian New Zealanders are people who have migrated from Hungary to New Zealand, and their descendants, if they choose to identify as such. Hungarian New Zealanders constitute a small minority of New Zealand's population. In the 2001 census in New Zealand, when asked to indicate their ethnic identity, 894 New Zealanders described themselves as "Hungarian", altogether 1,191 spoke Hungarian and 987 stated they were born in Hungary. In 2006 1476 people spoke Hungarian.

History

19th century

Hungarians began to emigrate to New Zealand in the middle of the 19th century, but this was not a permanent settling. After the Hungarian Revolution in 1848 small groups arrived from Hungary, but also they travelled forward. In the 1860s there was a gold rush in Otago, again small groups arrived in New Zealand. One of them, Zsigmond Vékey, a lawyer became the journalist of Otago Daily Times. Later he went back to Hungary. The first permanent settlers came between 1872 and 1876, and some people later in the 19th century.

20th century
In 1909 a certain man, named István Rácz arrived in Tuatapere, Southland. He wrote letters to his home in Csongrád, Hungary. Because of this, in 1911 three other families (the Szivák, Kollát and Kókay families) joined him from the city. During the next two decades still some families followed them, altogether approximately 100 families. Some of their descendants became famous: in 1970 István Kókay's son, Stephen Kokay was chosen as the representative of the Waiau district on the Wallace County Council. One of his daughters is a biologist, named Dr. Ilona Kokay, who teaches at the Otago University. His son Les Kokay is internationally recognised in music circles for his writings on Bob Dylan in ISIS magazine and other writings on Bob Dylan. He invented the ‘LesK’ cube (a 3x3x3 cube puzzle) and was the first to solve a ‘fairly hard’ tetra-cube puzzle. Mike Racz became a Guinness recorder as the fastest oyster opener.

In the beginning of the Second World War 55 Hungarians arrived, right after the war still 62. In the beginning of the 1950s another 136 Hungarians arrived in New Zealand.  The largest group of refugees from Hungary, 1099 people, arrived after the 1956 Revolution. Most of them was settled in the main centres of  Auckland, Wellington and Christchurch. One of them was Anna Porter (born Anna Szigethy), the novelist, who later moved to Canada. The fathers of Marton Csokas and Nándor Tánczos both were 1956-refugees. Tom Paulay, also a 1956-refugee, taught at the University of Canterbury. Until 1970 still 290 Hungarians settled down in New Zealand.

Hungarian culture in New Zealand
In the 1980s there was movement to create cultural associations. In 2006 such societies exist in four cities: Auckland, Wellington, Christchurch and Dunedin. On 20 August 2006, Magyar Millennium Park was opened in Wellington, featuring an original Székely gate.

There is a quarterly newspaper for the Hungarians, the Magyar Szó ("Hungarian Word").

Famous Hungarian New Zealanders
 Marton Csokas - actor, played in The Lord of the Rings and in the Kingdom of Heaven.
 Nándor Tánczos - cannabis advocate and former MP of the Parliament of New Zealand
 George Baloghy - artist, painter
 Imre Vallyon - writer
 Nick Horvath - naturalized basketball player
 Louis Fenton - New Zealand national football team player
 Sandor Earl - rugby player
 Claire Szabó - politician, president of the New Zealand Labour Party

There was a Hungarian football club, called Hungaria, notable members were:

 Imre Kiss
 Julius Beck
 Istvan Nemet

See also
 European New Zealanders
 Europeans in Oceania
 Hungarian Australians
 Immigration to New Zealand
 Pākehā

References

External links
 Newspaper Magyar Szó
 Home page of the Hungarian consulate in New Zealand
 Loui Kuthy - The old man of the sea
 Maverick - Dunedin

 

New Zealanders

European New Zealander